Henjak is a surname. Notable people with the surname include:

Ivan Henjak (born 1963), Australian rugby league player and coach
Matt Henjak (born 1981), Australian rugby union player, nephew of Ivan